Mwala Constituency is an electoral constituency in Kenya. The estimate terrain elevation above sea level is 834 meters. It is one of eight constituencies in Machakos County. The constituency was established for the 1988 elections. The constituency has seven wards, all electing councilors for the Masaku County Council.

Members of Parliament

Locations and wards

References

External links 
Map of the constituency
Map of Mwala

Constituencies in Eastern Province (Kenya)
Constituencies in Machakos County
1988 establishments in Kenya
Constituencies established in 1988